Vernon Township is a township in Lake County, Illinois, USA. As of the 2010 census, its population was 67,095. The name "Vernon Township" comes from George Washington's estate, Mount Vernon.

Geography
The stream of Indian Creek runs through this township. All communities within the township are North Central suburbs of Chicago.

Cities and towns
 Arlington Heights (northern edge of municipality)
 Bannockburn (western edge of municipality)
 Buffalo Grove (north three-quarters of Village)
 Indian Creek
 Lake Forest (west edge of Village)
 Lincolnshire (vast majority)
 Long Grove (east half)
 Mettawa (south half)
 Mundelein (southeast edge)
 Riverwoods (west three-quarters)
 Vernon Hills (south half)
 Wheeling (north edge)

Unincorporated towns
 Half Day
Prairie View

Adjacent townships
 Libertyville Township (north)
 Shields Township (northeast)
 West Deerfield Township (east)
 Northfield Township, Cook County (southeast)
 Wheeling Township, Cook County (south)
 Palatine Township, Cook County (southwest)
 Ela Township (west)
 Fremont Township (northwest)

Cemeteries
The township contains eight cemeteries: Diamond Lake, Gridley, Knopf, Long Grove, Lutheran, Vernon, Willow Lawn and Zion City.

Major highways
 Interstate 94
 U.S. Route 45
 Illinois State Route 21
 Illinois State Route 22
 Illinois State Route 53
 Illinois State Route 60
 Illinois State Route 83

Airports and landing strips
 Chicagoland Airport (historical)

Demographics

References
 U.S. Board on Geographic Names (GNIS)
 United States Census Bureau cartographic boundary files

External links
 Vernon Township official website
 US-Counties.com
 City-Data.com
 US Census
 Illinois State Archives

Townships in Lake County, Illinois
Townships in Illinois